Gregory C. Case (born 1963) is the chief executive officer of Aon plc. He has held this position since April 2005.

Early life and education
Case was born in Kansas City. 

Case received an undergraduate degree from Kansas State University, where he graduated summa cum laude. Case holds a Master of Business Administration from Harvard School of Business.

Career
Case was at first an investment banker. 

He then worked for 17 years at McKinsey & Company, where he eventually became head of the global insurance practice and then head of the financial services practice.

In April 2005, Case was named chief executive officer of Aon plc.

In September 2006, Case testified on behalf of Aon and the Council of Insurance Agents and Brokers to the US House of Representatives on the topic of risks of catastrophic terrorism events.

In 2018, Case received the Owen B. Butler Education Excellence Award from the Committee for Economic Development.

Case was named one of the 100 best performing CEOs in world in 2019 according to the Harvard Business Review.

Compensation
Case's compensation across 2007 to 2009 did not substantially change (11.3, 12.9, 10.4 million) despite a 95% drop in profits for the company in the 4th quarter of 2008.

References

1963 births
Living people
Harvard Business School alumni
American chief executives
Kansas State University alumni